This is a list of the French Singles & Airplay Chart Reviews number-ones of 1981.

Summary

Singles chart

See also
1981 in music
List of number-one hits (France)

References

Number-one singles
France
1981